Nearcticorpus is a genus of flies belonging to the family Lesser Dung flies.

Species
H. canadense Roháček & Marshall, 1982
H. pecki Roháček & Marshall, 1982

References

Sphaeroceridae
Diptera of North America
Brachycera genera